Nýrovce is an old village and municipality in the Levice District in the Nitra Region of Slovakia.

History
In historical records the village was first mentioned in 1247.

Geography
The village lies at an altitude of 153 metres and covers an area of 13.49 km². It has a population of about 565 people.

Ethnicity
The village is approximately 73% Magyar and 27% Slovak.

Facilities
The village has a public library and football pitch.

External links
http://www.statistics.sk/mosmis/eng/run.html

Villages and municipalities in Levice District